Maninka (also known as Malinke), or more precisely Eastern Maninka, is the name of several closely related languages and dialects of the southeastern Manding subgroup of the Mande language family. It is the mother tongue of the Malinké people in Guinea, where it is spoken by 3,300,000 people and is the main language in the Upper Guinea region, and in Mali, where the closely related Bambara is a national language, as well as in Liberia, Senegal, Sierra Leone and Ivory Coast, where it has no official status. It was the language of court and government during the Mali Empire.

Phonology
The Wudala dialect of Eastern Maninka, spoken in the central highlands of Guinea and comprehensible to speakers of all dialects in that country, has the following phonemic inventory. (Apart from tone, which is not written, sounds are given in orthography, as IPA values are not certain.)

Tones
There are two moraic tones, high and low, which in combination form rising and falling tones. 

The marker for definiteness is a falling floating tone:  'a bird' (LL),  'the bird' (LLHL, perhaps );  'a belly' (HL),  'the belly' (HLHL, perhaps ).

Vowels
(It may be that all nasal vowels are long.) Nasal vowels nasalize some following consonants.

Consonants

/d/ typically becomes a flap [ɾ] between vowels. /c/ (also written ) often becomes /k/ before the vowels /i/ or /ɛ/. There is regional variation between /g/ and the labial–velar /g͡b/. /h/ occurs mostly in Arabic loans, and is established. /p/ occurs in French and English loans, and is in the process of stabilizing. 

Several voiced consonants become nasals after a nasal vowel. /b/ becomes /m/, /j/ becomes /ɲ/, and /l/ becomes /n/. For example, nouns ending in oral vowels take the plural in -lu; nouns ending in nasal vowels take -nu. However, /d/ remains oral, as in /nde/ "I, me".

Writing
Maninka in Guinea is written in an official Latin-based script, an older official orthography (also Latin-based), and the N'Ko alphabet.

References

 Vydrine, Valentin. Manding–English Dictionary (Maninka, Bamana). Volume 1: A, B, D–DAD, Supplemented by Some Entries From Subsequent Volumes (1999). Dimitry Bulanin Publishing House, 315 pp. .

External links
Report on Malinke in Mali en Senegal
Some text from the language Museum
Language museum in kankan
Malidaba, an online French-English-Russian-Maninka dictionary

Manding languages
Languages of Guinea
Languages of Mali
Languages of Liberia
Languages of Senegal
Languages of Sierra Leone